FACN may refer to:

Fellow of the American College of Nutrition
 FACN, the ICAO code for Carnarvon Airport (South Africa)